The King Fahad Mosque (also King Fahd Mosque) is a mosque located in Culver City, California in Los Angeles County, US. The mosque has a capacity of 2,000 worshippers, "a marble facade, hand made tiles from Turkey, and a  minaret topped with a gold leaf crescent".

The mosque was financed by Saudi Arabia, specifically by Fahd of Saudi Arabia, after whom it is named, and by one of his sons, Prince Abdulaziz. The project was guided by then Director General and present Chairman of The Board, Khalil Al Khalil.
It cost $2.16 million according to the Embassy of Saudi Arabia, and $8 million according to Washington Post. 
In a statement issued for the opening of the mosque, the Embassy of Saudi Arabia stated this was part of the "great attention" the Kingdom of Saudi Arabia "has given to Islamic centers, institutes and universities in non-Islamic countries to help Muslim minorities preserve their Islamic culture and educate them in the Arabic language".

Prince Abdulaziz Bin Fahad Bin Abdulaziz Al-Saud, who was Minister of State and a Saudi cabinet member, provided funding for the land in 1993. King Fahad pledged funds for the construction of the building in 1995. Work began on the mosque in April 1996 and was opened in July 1998, with a ceremony and dinner attended by former chief of the White House staff John Sununu. Facilities for school for the recitation of the Qur’an and education in the Islamic sciences are to be (as of 1998) built adjacent to the mosque.

The Mosque is open daily for all five prayers. It is owned and managed by The Islamic Foundation of Shaikh Ibn Taymiyyah.

The Islamic Foundation of Shaikh Ibn Taymiyyah

The Islamic Foundation of Shaikh Ibn Taymiyyah preceded the mosque. It supervised its planning, design, etc., and now owns and operates the mosque (as well as that of two other Southern California mosques — Masjid al Salam in central Los Angeles, and Islamic Center of Riverside, California — and supervises "Zamzam Schools" for "girls' education and the memorization of the Qur'an"). The foundation was established in 1980 (1400 AH). It began as the "Muslim Student House" in the western Los Angeles area. As the Muslim population and Saudi funding grew, a house was purchased in the same area for prayers, lectures and Dawa activities. The foundation is now located at 11004 Washington Boulevard, across Huron Ave from the Mosque, in what Google Maps shows as an unmarked white two-story building.

Named after the 14th century Islamic jurist, Ibn Taymiyyah, the foundation is an Islamic charity organization under US law, and as such is exempt from taxes, entitled to own property and practice religious, educational, informational and intellectual activities throughout the US. As of 2017 it reported revenues of $320,000 and five employees.

The foundation's stated objectives are:

 "Propagation of Islam in the light of the Glorious Quran and Traditions of Prophet Muhammad in keeping with the method of the righteous predecessors."
 "Preserving of the Islamic Faith, unifying Muslim ranks to regain their rights and be proud of their religion and civilization."
 "Construction of mosques, schools and colleges, organization of conferences and publication of books."
 "Linking Muslims in America with their Muslim brothers everywhere."
 "Enhancing cordial and humanitarian relations with various foundations, engaging into a mutual dialogue based on justice and pride."

9/11 Controversy

According to FBI documents and a CIA memo noted in a congressional report into the attacks of September 11, 2001, the hijackers Khalid al-Midhar and Nawaf al-Hazmi may have been in contact with Saudi diplomat Shaykh al-Thumairy, who was the chief imam  at the King Fahad Mosque (most of the 9/11 hijackers were Saudi nationals and several were not fluent in English and had little experience living in the West). According to the congressional report, the mosque was identified by the FBI as a site of “extremist-related activity both before and after September 11”. According top the commission, “several subjects of FBI investigations prior to September 11 had close connections to the mosque and are believed to have laundered money through this mosque to nonprofit organizations overseas affiliated with Usama Bin Ladin.”

In May 2003, the US State Department refused to allow  Fahad al Thumairy to reenter the United States. According to the 9/11 Commission Report (issued July 2004)  the State Department had determined "he might be connected with terrorist activity."

However, "later investigations found no evidence that the Saudi government or senior Saudi officials knowingly supported those who orchestrated the attacks, according to CBS News. Saudi Foreign Minister Adel Aljubeir said he hopes the congressional report will “bring an end to the speculation and conspiracy theories.” A small demonstration by conservatives was held "challenged the mosque to issue a fatwa repudiating Osama bin Laden and other terrorists by name" in September 2006.

See also
  List of mosques in the Americas
  Lists of mosques 
  List of mosques in the United States
International propagation of Salafism and Wahhabism

References

External links
King Fahad Mosque on YouTube

Mosques in California
Culver City, California